Thulium phosphide is an inorganic compound of thulium and phosphorus with the chemical formula TmP.

Synthesis
Reaction of thulium metal with phosphorus:

4 Tm + P4 → 4 TmP

Physical properties
The dense phosphide film will prevent further reactions inside the metal. After etching gallium arsenide, an epitaxial layer of thulium phosphide can be grown on the surface to obtain a TmP/GaAs heterostructure.

The compound forms crystals of a cubic system, space group Fm3m. TmP crystallizes in a NaCl-type structure at ambient pressure.

Uses
The compound is a semiconductor used in high power, high frequency applications and in laser and other photo diodes.

References

Phosphides
Thulium compounds
Semiconductors
Rock salt crystal structure